Deslys is a surname. Notable people with the surname include:

Charles Deslys (1821–1885), French writer
Gaby Deslys (1881–1920) French dancer, singer, and actress
Kay Deslys (1899–1974), British comedy actress in 1920s American films
Lily Deslys, a stage name of Lili Damita (1904–1994), French actress 

French-language surnames